Staurothele fissa is a species of fungus belonging to the family Verrucariaceae.

It has cosmopolitan distribution.

References

Verrucariales
Lichen species